Track Rock is located in the Track Rock Gap Archaeological Area (9Un367) in the Brasstown Ranger District of the Chattahoochee National Forest in Georgia.  This  area contains preserved petroglyphs of ancient Native American origin that resemble animal and bird tracks, crosses, circles and human footprints.  

The Georgia Historical Marker placed there in 1988 says:
 This area is one of the best-known of the petroglyph, or marked stone, sites in Georgia. The six table-sized soapstone boulders contain hundreds of symbols carved or pecked into their surface. Archaeologists have speculated dates for the figures from the Archaic Period (8,000 to 1,000 B.C.) to the Cherokee Indians who lived here until the 19th Century. No one knows the exact meaning of the symbols or glyphs which represent animals, birds, tracks and geometric figures. The earliest written account (1834) was by Dr. Matthew Stephenson, who was director of the U.S. Branch Mint in Dahlonega. One of the favorite stories about Track Rock Gap was recorded by ethnographer James Mooney who gathered Cherokee stories. The Cherokee called this site Datsu'nalasgun'ylu (where there are tracks) and Degayelun'ha (the printed or branded place). Cherokee stories include an explanation that hunters paused in the gap and amused themselves by carving the glyphs: the marks were made in a great hunt when the animals were driven through the gap, and that the tracks were made when the animals were leaving the great canoe after a flood almost destroyed the world and while the earth and rocks were soft.

In 1867, conservationist John Muir traveled nearby and met a mountaineer who said, "It is called Track Gap ... from the great number of tracks in the rocks – bird tracks, bar tracks, hoss tracks, men tracks, all in the solid rock as if it had been mud." 

There is a gravel parking lot at Track Rock; the site is also accessible via the Arkaquah Trail.  Track Rock Gap Archaeological Area is under consideration for listing on the National Register of Historic Places, reference number 76002336, but it is still pending.

References

External links
Anonymous (nda) American Indian Partners Work to Protect Track Rock Gap, Chattahoochee-Oconee National Forests, USDA Forest Service, Gainesville, Georgia.
Anonymous (ndb) Track Rock Gap rock art site, Chattahoochee-Oconee National Forests, USDA Forest Service, Gainesville, Georgia.
Anonymous (2004) Track Rock, Roadside Georgia web page.
Edwards, L. (2001) Track Rock Gap (natural history). The Georgia Botanical Society.
Loubser, J. (2013)"The Stone-Walled Complex within Track Rock Gap, Union County, far northern Georgia". Society for Georgia Archaeology, Athens, Georgia.
Moya-Smith, S. (2012) "Forest Service, Native Community Seek to Protect Sacred Site", Indian Country Today.
Wettstaed, J. (2011)"Track Rock Gap site: a new vision of petroglyphs", Society for Georgia Archaeology, Athens, Georgia.
USDA Forest Service page

Archaeological sites in Georgia (U.S. state)
Landmarks in Georgia (U.S. state)
Protected areas of Union County, Georgia
Chattahoochee-Oconee National Forest
Petroglyphs in Georgia (U.S. state)